Black Orpheus is an album by Nigerian musician Keziah Jones.

Track listings
"AfrosurrealismForTheLadies"
"Kpafuca"
"Femiliarise"
"Wet Questions"
"Neptune"
"72 Kilos"
"All Praises"
"Beautiful Emilie"
"Sadness Is"
"Autumn Moon"
"The Black Orpheus"
"Orin O' Lomi"

Limited edition
CD1

 "AfrosurrealismForTheLadies"
 "Kpafuca"
 "Femiliarise"
 "Wet Questions"
 "Neptune"
 "72 Kilos"
 "All Praises"
 "Beautiful Emilie"
 "Sadness Is"
 "Autumn Moon"
 "The Black Orpheus"
 "Orin O' Lomi"

CD2

 "Cutest Lips" (acoustic)
 "Guitar in the River"
 "All Along the Watchtower" (acoustic)
 "Beautiful Emilie" (acoustic)
 "Neurotica"
 "Rhythm Is Love" (acoustic)
 "Million Miles from Home" (acoustic)
 "When Somebody Loves You" (acoustic)
 "So Much Trouble in the World"

Charts

References

2003 albums
Keziah Jones albums